The First Hittinger Block is a historic two-story building in Tucson, Arizona. It was designed in the Italianate style, and built in 1901. It was named for Anton Hittinger, an investor who purchased the building in 1892 and erected other buildings around it. It housed the Harry A. Drachman Shoe Company, whose eponymous founder served in the Arizona Senate from 1923 to 1924. It has been listed on the National Register of Historic Places since September 12, 2003.

References

National Register of Historic Places in Pima County, Arizona
Italianate architecture in Arizona
Commercial buildings completed in 1901
1901 establishments in Arizona Territory